Exeter Book Riddle 65 (according to the numbering of the Anglo-Saxon Poetic Records) is one of the Old English riddles found in the later tenth-century Exeter Book. Suggested solutions have included Onion, Leek, and Chives, but the consensus is that the solution is Onion.

Text and translation 
As edited by Krapp and Dobbie and translated by Andrew Higl, the riddle reads:

Analogues 
The riddle is frequently compared with Exeter Book Riddle 25, also on the onion, but noted for its double entendre, since in that riddle what to many readers will come first to mind as the obvious solution to the riddle is 'penis'. Meanwhile, its analogue in the late-antique Latin riddles of Symphosius is:

Editions 

 Krapp, George Philip and Elliott Van Kirk Dobbie (eds), The Exeter Book, The Anglo-Saxon Poetic Records, 3 (New York: Columbia University Press, 1936), p. 230.
 Williamson, Craig (ed.), The Old English Riddles of the Exeter Book (Chapel Hill: University of North Carolina Press, 1977).
 Muir, Bernard J. (ed.), The Exeter Anthology of Old English Poetry: An Edition of Exeter Dean and Chapter MS 3501, 2nd edn, 2 vols (Exeter: Exeter University Press, 2000).

References 

Riddles
Old English literature
Old English poetry